Alexei "Alyosha" A. Efros is a Russian-American computer scientist and professor at University of California, Berkeley. He is widely recognized for his contributions to computer vision and his work has been referenced in media outlets including Wired, BBC News, The New York Times, and the New Yorker.

Biography
Efros was born in St. Petersburg, USSR. His father is Alexei L. Efros, then a physics professor at the Ioffe Physico-Technical Institute. His family emigrated to the United States when he was 14 to accommodate his father's career and the family settled in Salt Lake City in 1991. He graduated from the University of Utah in 1997 and attended University of California, Berkeley for his PhD, advised by Jitendra Malik, graduating in 2003. He then spent a year as a research fellow at the University of Oxford to work with Andrew Zisserman. He joined the faculty at Carnegie Mellon University,  where he remained until 2013 when he joined the faculty at UC Berkeley. He received a Guggenheim Fellowship in 2008. He received the 2016 ACM Prize in Computing.

References

Living people
American computer scientists
Machine learning researchers
Russian emigrants to the United States
University of Utah alumni
University of California, Berkeley alumni
Carnegie Mellon University faculty
UC Berkeley College of Engineering faculty
Computer vision researchers
Recipients of the ACM Prize in Computing
1975 births